Associação Desportiva Limoeiro Futebol Clube, commonly known as Limoeiro, is a Brazilian football club based in Limoeiro do Norte, Ceará state. They competed in the Série C once.

History

Foundation
The club was founded on February 1, 2001. Limoeiro won the Campeonato Cearense Second Division in 2001 and in 2009. They competed in the Série C in 2004, when they reached the Final Stage of the competition, finishing in the fourth place, and thus failing to gain promotion to the following year's Série B.

Achievements

 Campeonato Cearense Second Division:
 Winners (2): 2001, 2009

Stadium
Associação Desportiva Limoeiro Futebol Clube play their home games at Estádio José de Oliveira Bandeira, nicknamed Bandeirão. The stadium has a maximum capacity of 5,000 people.

References

Association football clubs established in 2001
Football clubs in Ceará
2001 establishments in Brazil